Juan Legua is an oil on canvas painting by Spanish cubist Juan Gris created in 1911. The painting is Gris' cubist interpretation of a sitter. The work is currently in the collection of the Metropolitan Museum of Art.

References 

1911 paintings
Cubist paintings
Paintings in the collection of the Metropolitan Museum of Art
Paintings by Juan Gris